"Private Dancer" is a song made famous in 1984 by American singer Tina Turner. First recorded by British rock band Dire Straits, it was written by the group's lead vocalist Mark Knopfler and produced by John Carter for Turner's fifth solo album of the same name.  Released as the album's fifth single, the track reached number seven on the US Billboard Hot 100 and number three on the US R&B chart. The song had moderate international success, reaching number 26 on the UK Singles Chart.

Background
The song was intended for Dire Straits' fourth album Love over Gold. The instruments were recorded, but Mark Knopfler considered the lyrics unsuitable for a male singer, so the track was dropped from the project. Legal restrictions prevented the original recording being used by Tina Turner, so two years later it was remade by members of Dire Straits. Terry Williams replaced the original drummer Pick Withers. Knopfler did not appear on the track and was replaced by Jeff Beck. Turner told DJ Roger Scott:

Knopfler once said the song was ruined due to "them drafting in Jeff Beck to play the world's second-ugliest guitar solo".

Critical reception
The Daily Vault's Mark Millan wrote, "It's a sexy, dark track that gives the album an edge and also a chance for Turner's powerful sexuality to sparkle."

Music video
The accompanying music video for "Private Dancer", featuring dance choreography by Arlene Phillips, was directed by Brian Grant and filmed at London's Rivoli Ballroom. It features Turner as a disillusioned taxi dancer, although the song has also been interpreted as being sung from the perspective of a prostitute. The video was later published on Turner's official YouTube channel in March 2009. It has amassed more than 34,9 million views as of October 2021.

Personnel
Tina Turner – vocals
Jeff Beck – guitar solo
John Illsley – bass guitar
Alan Clark – keyboards
Hal Lindes – guitar
Terry Williams – drums
Mel Collins – tenor saxophone
Julian Diggle and Carter – percussion
Norman Seeff – cover photography (US)
 Peter Ashworth – cover photography (UK)

Versions and mixes
 7-inch edit – 3:54
 Album version – 7:11
 The album version was remastered in 2015. The song remained the same length and is titled "Private Dance – 2015 Remaster."

Charts

Weekly charts

Year-end charts

Cover versions

American singer-songwriter, rapper, and bassist Meshell Ndegeocello recorded a cover version of the song for her album Ventriloquism, released on March 16, 2018.

In 2015, Canadian electronic musician and performance artist Peaches performed a piano version of the song on The Strombo Show at the home of George Stroumboulopoulos. Peaches had previously played the song live at different concerts.

References

External links

1984 singles
Tina Turner songs
Songs written by Mark Knopfler
1984 songs
Songs about dancing
Capitol Records singles
Songs about prostitutes
Smooth jazz songs
1980s ballads
Contemporary R&B ballads
Pop ballads